Harvey G. Cragon (21 April 1929 – 7 September 2018) was an American engineer, who was the Ernest Cockrell, Jr. Centennial Chair Emeritus at the Cockrell School of Engineering, University of Texas at Austin.

Early career 
In 1950, Cragon graduated with a Bachelor of Science degree in electrical engineering from Louisiana Tech University in Ruston, Louisiana. After graduating, he worked for  Southern Bell Telephone Company in New Orleans for a year and then spent two years in the U.S. Army in a unit that tested infrared night vision devices in the Mojave Desert. In 1953, he joined the Hughes Aircraft Company in Los Angeles, where he worked on automated air defense systems. While at Hughes, he took courses at the University of California, Los Angeles. In 1957, he moved to Tennessee, where he worked as an engineer on the digital instrumentation of a wind tunnel at the United States Air Force (USAF) Arnold Engineering Development Center in Tullahoma with a UNIVAC 1102.

Texas Instruments 
In 1959, Cragon joined  Texas Instruments, Incorporated in  Dallas, Texas, to work on applying digital technology to develop processors for a variety of applications, including seismic data analysis. In 1961, he built the first digital computer (and similar digital central processing units) for use on rockets. He led the development of the TI-870 signal processor in the mid-1960s, as well as the construction of a transistorized computer. In 1965 he started the TI Advanced Scientific Computer (ASC), one of the first vector supercomputers. Its main problem was the cooling of the processor, but it was solved well enough for the ASC to be used until 1985. In the 1970s, he led the development of the TMS320 signal processor, which came out in 1983. The TMS320 and subsequent digital signal processors were revolutionary and had a significant impact in the field.

University of Texas at Austin 
After twenty-five years with Texas Instruments, Cragon left industry to teach in academia. As the Ernest Cockrell, Jr. Centennial Chair in Engineering in the Department of Electrical and Computer Engineering at the University of Texas at Austin from 1984 to 1999, he advised and mentored numerous undergraduate, masters, and doctoral students. He taught courses in computer architecture and wrote three books on the subject.

Retirement 
Upon his retirement in 1999, Cragon was named a Professor Emeritus at UT Austin. He and Henrietta then moved to Dallas, where he became a visiting professor at Southern Methodist University and the University of Texas at Dallas. He continued research on a variety of topics, and wrote books on the development of early computers, including the British code-breaking computer Colossus, the Norden Bombsight, and torpedo data computers developed during World War II.

Cragon died at The Glen, Shreveport, Louisiana on 7 September 2018.

Bibliography

Works Cited

References

1929 births
2018 deaths
University of Texas at Austin faculty
20th-century American engineers
American electrical engineers
Computer designers
Members of the United States National Academy of Engineering
Fellow Members of the IEEE
Fellows of the Association for Computing Machinery
Louisiana Tech University alumni
Burials in Louisiana